Justice Donahue may refer to:

Charles Donahue, associate justice of the Massachusetts Supreme Judicial Court
Maurice H. Donahue, associate justice of the Supreme Court of Ohio